"Dashing Away with the Smoothing Iron" is a traditional English folk song about a man admiring his girlfriend as she goes through daily stages of washing and ironing clothes. It is classified as Round number 869. The earliest date in the Vaughan Williams catalogue is 1904, noted by Cecil Sharp. A later entry, for 1908 gives the source as Jane Gulliford from Somerset. The Fresno State University gives a slightly different title "Driving Away at the Smoothing Iron" with a date of 1909.

In popular culture 
The pop group Manfred Mann published a short version (less than two minutes) on their 1965 album The Five Faces of Manfred Mann. 

The musical comedy duo Flanders and Swann quoted the first 7/8 syllables of each verse, verbatim and notewise, at the beginning of each verse of The Gas Man Cometh, the first track on At The Drop of Another Hat.

In 1973 the tune was used by the English composer John Rutter for the fourth movement of his Suite for Strings under the title Dashing Away.

In Downton Abbey season 3, episode 3, Carson sings this song to himself after finding out that Mrs. Hughes does not have cancer.

Lyrics

'Twas on a [ Monday | Tuesday | Wednesday | Thursday | Friday | Saturday | Sunday ] morning
When I beheld my darling
She looked so neat and charming
In every high degree
She looked so neat and nimble, O
[ A-washing | A-shaking | A-drying | A-airing | A-ironing | A-folding | A-wearing ] of her linen, O

Refrain
Dashing away with the smoothing iron
Dashing away with the smoothing iron
Dashing away with the smoothing iron
She stole my heart away.

See also
 "Monday's Child", a traditional English rhyme mentioning the days of the week
 "Solomon Grundy", an English nursery rhyme mentioning the days of the week

References

External links 
The lyrics to Dashing Away with the Smoothing Iron
The lyrics with the musical notes to Dashing Away with the Smoothing Iron

English folk songs
19th-century songs
Songwriter unknown
Year of song unknown